The 1902 Latrobe Athletic Association season was their eighth season in existence. It was a low profile season for Latrobe. The team played in only 4 games this season and finished 2-0-2.

Schedule

Game notes

References

Latrobe Athletic Association
Latrobe Athletic Association seasons